The Sonora Cartel, also known as Caro Quintero Organization, was a Mexico based criminal cartel.  Upon the cartel's disintegration, its leaders were incorporated into the Tijuana Cartel and Sinaloa Cartel.

By 2007, Sonora Cartel, Colima Cartel and Milenio Cartel became branches of the Sinaloa Cartel.

Background 
The Sonora Cartel was considered by the United States Drug Enforcement Administration (DEA) to be one of the oldest and best-established cartels. The Sonora cartel was headed by Miguel Caro Quintero, brother to Guadalajara Cartel co-founder Rafael Caro Quintero, and operated out of Hermosillo, Agua Prieta, Guadalajara and Culiacán, as well as the Mexican states of Nayarit, Sinaloa and Sonora. The Sonora cartel's roots are in the Guadalajara Cartel, which dissolved after the 1989 arrest of its co-founder, Miguel Ángel Félix Gallardo. The Sonora cartel had direct links to Colombian drug cartels and operated routes into California, Arizona, Texas and Nevada. 

Rafael Caro Quintero was  arrested in Costa Rica in 1985 in connection with the torture and death of DEA Special Agent Enrique "Kiki" Camarena. Miguel Caro Quintero would eventually be arrested in 1989, however it was believed he still maintained control over the organization from behind bars. By 2007, however, the Sinaloa Cartel had acquired the Sonora Cartel.

Operations
The Sonora Cartel is believed to be one of the earliest cartels to begin shipping cocaine from Colombia, particularly from the Cali Cartel. The cartel was involved in the cultivation and distribution of marijuana primarily, however secondary functions include the transportation and distribution of methamphetamine.

Operating out of northern central Mexico, the cartel was believed to smuggle drugs into Arizona, Texas and California from a network of ranches along the northern border region where the drugs are stored prior to shipment. The Sonora Cartel has been specifically linked to operating out of Hermosillo and Agua Prieta in Sonora, but also less so in Guadalajara in Jalisco, Culiacán in Sinaloa, and the States of Nayarit and Durango.

Acquired by the Sinaloa Cartel by 2007, the Sonora Cartel was reported as defunct at the time of Miguel Angel Caro Quintero's conviction in 2010.

Despite their eventual releases from prison, the Caro Quintero brothers have lost influence in the Mexican drug business, with ex-DEA agent Mike Vigil even stating in the June 2020 that Rafael Caro Quintero "will fall before he dies of old age." Vigil also revealed that Sinaloa Cartel's Los Salazar affiliate was now a major figure in Sonora's drug trafficking business. However, both Rafael and Miguel Caro Quintero had recently rejected offers to join the Sinaloa Cartel due to a fallout with the sons of imprisoned former leader Joaquín Archivaldo Guzmán over leadership status. Despite this, both were said to be on good terms with de jure Sinaloa Cartel leader Ismael "El Mayo" Zambada, who was now in poor health.

Miguel Caro Quintero

Miguel Caro Quintero was born in Caborca, Sonora, Mexico, in 1963. Previously arrested in 1992 on charges of tax evasion, he was found not guilty, which the DEA attributes to the use of threats and bribes by Caro Quintero. While imprisoned, it is believed Caro Quintero was still running the Sonora Cartel, where he is purging a prison sentence for racketeering, drug smuggling and money laundering. Caro Quintero was arrested in December 2001 in Los Mochis, Sinaloa. Prior to his arrest he repeatedly stated he is innocent of the charges and has accused the DEA of pursuing a vendetta against him for his brother, Rafael Caro Quintero's, alleged role in the death of DEA Special Agent Enrique Camarena. Miguel Caro Quintero is noted as having called into a radio station to profess his innocence, stating: "If I had a cartel, I'd have a lot of money and my brother wouldn't be there (in jail)" and claiming to be an innocent rancher. He further stated he does not believe his brother was involved in the killing of the DEA agent.

Rafael Caro Quintero

Rafael Caro Quintero is the co-founder, with Miguel Ángel Félix Gallardo, of the Guadalajara Cartel and Sonora Cartel.  He was arrested in Costa Rica on April 4, 1985, for the kidnapping, torture and murder of federal agent Enrique Camarena, and was also charged with violent crimes in aid of racketeering, possession with intent to distribute marijuana and cocaine, murder, continuing criminal enterprise.

See also
List of gangs in Mexico
Mexican Drug War
Drug Enforcement Administration
Guadalajara Cartel
Mexico–US border

References

Organizations established in the 1980s
1980s establishments in Mexico
Organizations disestablished in 2007
2007 disestablishments in Mexico
Disbanded Mexican drug cartels
History of Sonora
Mexican drug war
Transnational organized crime
Organized crime groups in the United States
Gangs in Arizona
Gangs in California
Gangs in Nevada
Gangs in Texas